The Waioeka River is found in the north of New Zealand's North Island. It shares its estuary with the Otara River.

History
The area around the Waioeka valley was the scene of much fighting during the New Zealand wars.

Rivers of the Bay of Plenty Region
Rivers of the Gisborne District
Rivers of New Zealand
Ōpōtiki